Route 135 is a New Brunswick provincial collector road that runs  between Saint-Isidore and Pokeshaw.

Communities
 Saint-Isidore
 Hacheyville
 Duguayville
 Bois-Blanc
 Paquetville
 Trudel
 Burnsville
 Black Rock
 Pokeshaw

See also
List of New Brunswick provincial highways

References

New Brunswick provincial highways
Roads in Gloucester County, New Brunswick